Brigadier General James Campbell Stewart,  (19 January 1884 – 2 June 1947) was an Australian public servant and a senior officer in the Australian Army during the First World War.

References

1884 births
1947 deaths
Australian Companions of the Distinguished Service Order
Australian Companions of the Order of St Michael and St George
Australian Freemasons
Australian generals
Australian military personnel of World War I
Volunteer Defence Corps officers
Military personnel from Victoria (Australia)
Public servants from Melbourne